Bailey Voisin (born 20 February 2003) is a British racing driver currently competing in the European Le Mans Series with United Autosports. He is a champion of the GT4 European Series, having won the title alongside Charlie Fagg in 2021.

Career

Ginetta Junior 
Voisin made his car racing debut, competing for Douglas Motorsport in the Ginetta Junior Championship. His season proved to be a challenge, as the Swiss driver ended up 13th overall, having scored a best race finish of seventh at Thruxton.

The following season, Voisin returned to the Ginetta Junior series, this time driving for R Racing. The start of the campaign brought immediate success, with Voisin winning the season opener in Donington and taking a pair of victories, as well as a podium, during round two at Brands Hatch. More wins at Knockhill and Thruxton elevated Voisin into the title battle, before he claimed another double, this time at Silverstone. Despite a triple of podiums at the penultimate round, Voisin would miss out on the title at Brands Hatch, ending up third, a mere twelve points behind championship winner Tom Lebbon.

GT4 European Series 
In 2021, it was announced that Voisin would be making a switch to the GT4 European Series, pairing up with Charlie Fagg at United Autosports. At the season opener in Monza, Voisin and Fagg took a pair of victories, surging into the lead of the championship. A podium at Paul Ricard followed before a pair of points finishes came in Zandvoort, which put the team behind the Nr.8 CMR entry in the standings. This would not deter the British pairing, who bounced back with pole position and a race win in Belgium, as well as two podiums at the Nürburgring. Voisin, along with Fagg, clinched the title at the final round in Barcelona, having finished Race 1 in fifth place, thus creating an unreachable lead in the overall championship.

European Le Mans Series 
The Briton progressed to the European Le Mans Series in 2022, returning to United Autosports, with whom he would compete in the LMP3 category alongside Josh Caygill and Finn Gehrsitz. Their season started in strong fashion, as the team finished third at Le Castellet, which turned into second once a car ahead had been disqualified. However, the outfit were unable to match that result for the following four rounds, with two retirements sandwiching a pair of points finishes. The season ended positively, with Voisin, Gehrsitz and Caygill taking another second place in the Algarve, which elevated them to eighth in the championship.

Racing record

Racing career summary 

† As Voisin was a guest driver, he was ineligible to score points.* Season still in progress.

Complete GT4 European Series results 
(key) (Races in bold indicate pole position; results in italics indicate fastest lap)

Complete European Le Mans Series results

References

External links 

 

2003 births
Living people
British racing drivers
European Le Mans Series drivers
Ginetta Junior Championship drivers
United Autosports drivers
GT4 European Series drivers